Albania and Montenegro share a border.

Economic migration

The border between Albania and Montenegro is viewed by many economic migrants as a route into the prosperous economies of Central and Western Europe.

In 2018 entrepreneurial smugglers began to offer a new route into the European Union, running from Greece through Albania, Montenegro and Bosnia to Croatia, a member state of the European Union.  About 11,000 migrants from Asia and North Africa took this route and registered their arrival within the European Union in Bosnia in the first half of 2018, compared with  755 migrant arrivals in 2017.

Troop deployment
On 11 July 2018, Montenegro announced that it was deploying regular army troops along the border to stop illegal migrants from entering the country at the Bozaj crossing from Albania,  from the Montenegrin city of Podgorica.

Barrier 

A border fence to block illegal entrants from crossing the border from Albania into Montenegro was proposed in May 2018. In June, Hungary offered to  supply  of razor-wire fencing to Montenegro. Montenegrin Prime Minister Dusko Markovic denied that his country was considering building a border fence in early July. Markovic thanked Orban for his offer, but responded that responded that "For now, there are no reasons for that."

Vojislav Dragovic, who is Head of the Border Department, has stated that a fence may be necessary because Albanian authorities have failed to abide by the bilateral readmission agreement that obliges them to admit migrants turned back by Montenegro.

Albanian community in Montenegro

Montenegro is also said to be concerned about recent growth of the small Albanian community in Montenegro.

References 

 
Human migration
International borders